Esenli can refer to:

 Esenli
 Esenli, Bigadiç
 Esenli, Çilimli
 Esenli, Hınıs
 Esenli, Kastamonu